Carl Blaurock (April 22, 1894 – February 1, 1993) was an American mountaineer. He pioneered many climbing routes throughout Colorado and Mount Blaurock is named after him. Blaurock and climbing partner Bill Ervin were the first to climb all of the 14,000-foot peaks (known as "fourteeners") in the state of Colorado, doing so by 1923.

By 1957, he had also climbed all of the  peaks in California as well. In Wyoming, Blaurock participated in the first ascents of Mount Helen, Mount Turret, and Mount Harding along with Hermann Buhl, Elmina Buhl and Albert Ellingwood.  In Colorado, he also made the first ascent of Lone Eagle Peak with Stephen H. Hart and Bill Ervin on Labor Day 1929.

In 1912, Blaurock became an early member of the Colorado Mountain Club, but was not a charter member.

Early life and education 
He was born in Denver, Colorado. He studied at North Denver High School and later went on to study metallurgy at the Colorado School of Mines in Golden, Colorado, graduating in 1916.

After graduation, he worked for his father and took over the family business until his retirement in 1972. His business helped to finance his hobbies, including mountaineering and photography, but it also limited the amount of time he could spend outside of Colorado.

Mountaineering 
Blaurock's first major climb was Pikes Peak.

In 1912, he became a member of the Colorado Mountain Club.  He was very active in the club throughout his life, participating in club hikes all over the state of Colorado.

In 1916, he had what he described as his closest brush with death when he slid several hundred feet from the top of one of Colorado's Saint Vrain Glaciers and landed in a crevasse.

In 1920, Blaurock made an expedition to the Sangre de Cristo Range in southern Colorado and climbed the Crestone Needle. Initially, he thought it was the first ascent, but later discovered that Albert Ellingwood and Eleanor Davis had climbed it in 1916.

Blaurock and his climbing partner, Bill Ervin, were the first to summit all of Colorado's 14,000-foot peaks, completing this feat in 1923.

In 1924, he made an expedition to the Wind River Range in Wyoming with Albert Ellingwood, Herman Buhl, and Emma Buhl. There, the group managed to make first ascents of Mount Helen, Mount Turret, and Mount Warren.

In 1925, Blaurock and two others retrieved the body of his friend Agnes Vaille, who had succeeded in making the first winter ascent of the East Face of Colorado's Longs Peak, but died on the descent as the weather deteriorated into a blizzard.

In 1926, Blaurock traveled to Europe to climb in the Alps.

In 1957, he completed his goal of climbing all 14,000-foot peaks in California.  This made him the first person to summit all fourteeners in the continental United States. He declared that his favorite climb was Longs Peak's east face, which he completed 18 times.

Blaurock was known among the mountaineering community for doing handstands on the summits of mountains and pictures exist of him doing so on Longs Peak and Sunlight Peak (also in Colorado). He joked that it was his method of getting his feet higher on the mountains than anybody else.

His last climb was in 1973, to the summit of Notch Mountain in Colorado. The trip was to commemorate William Henry Jackson's photograph of the Mount of the Holy Cross and he placed a plaque at the position from which Jackson took his photograph.

Legacy 
To honor Blaurock's legacy of climbing, the U.S. Department of the Interior named a 13,616-foot peak Mount Blaurock on July 11, 2004.

Personal life
In 1925, he met Louise Forsyth while on a Colorado Mountain Club outing. They were married soon after and their marriage lasted until her death, 65 years later.

See also

 List of people from Denver
 Lists of sportspeople

References

External links
Information from the Denver Post Archives This article states that Blaurock was a charter member, which is inaccurate (as per CMC Archives). He joined a few months after the CMC was founded. This DP article also misidentifies the first photo as Carl Blaurock when it is in fact Albert Ellingwood.
Photographs by Carl Blaurock

Place of death missing
1894 births
1993 deaths
American founders
American mountain climbers
Colorado School of Mines alumni
Pikes Peak
Sportspeople from Denver